Barnsley Park is a country house and park, measuring about  in circumference in Barnsley, Gloucestershire, England.

History

In 1693, the estate was inherited by Brereton Bourchier who started the construction of the present house. His daughter, Martha, married Henry Perrot the member of parliament for Oxfordshire from 1721 to 1740, who completed the house during the 1720s. The architect is not known although several authors have speculated about who was responsible. It was owned for a period by the Perrot family, and in 1819 it was owned by James Musgrave.

The house was redecorated around 1780 by Anthony Keck, with further work by John Nash, including the library and conservatory, around 1811. The landscaped garden was laid out in the 18th century and has mature hardwood trees.  In 1794 the parkland was extended by diverting the road to Ablington.

Architecture

The Georgian three-storey house has a west front of nine bays with a central door with pediments. The east front has seven bays. The interior is decorated with extensive plastrework, particularly on the staircase and halls.

The extensive grounds and parkland include several subsidiary buildings. The gatehouse built by John Nash around 1810 is now known as Pepper-pot Lodge, another lodge was added in the mid 19th century. It has a slate roof supported by ionic columns.

The stable block and coach houses were added in the early 19th century. These are now used as six workshops for small businesses.

The estate has its own pumping house which was constructed in the late 19th century, and a large 18th century barn. There is also an 18th-century dovecote, and a range of cottages originally built for the workers but now rented out.

The formal gardens, close to the house, are divided by hedges laid out in the 1960s. Further from the house are plantations primarily made of beech trees but with some specimen planting including Wellingtonia. Other trees planted in the park include silver birch, and mixed deciduous and coniferous species  The east lawn  provides a Patte d'oie which acts as a focal point of several drives through the grounds.

References

External links

Country houses in Gloucestershire
Grade II* listed parks and gardens in Gloucestershire
Grade II listed buildings in Gloucestershire
Grade I listed houses in Gloucestershire
Scheduled monuments in Gloucestershire